Aubin (Languedocien: Aubinh) is a commune in the Aveyron department in the Occitanie of southern France.

The inhabitants of the commune are known as Aubinois.

Geography
Aubin is located some 20 km south-east of Figeac and immediately south of Decazeville. Access to the commune is by road D 5 from Viviez in the north-west which passes through the centre of the commune and the town and continues south to Montbazens. The D221 goes from the town north to Decazeville. The D 11 goes east from the town to Cransac. The minor D 513 road branches off the D 5 on the north-western border of the commune and goes east through the north of the commune to Firmi. The Capdenac-Gare to Rodez railway line passes through the commune and there is a station at the town: Aubin station. Apart from the town there are the hamlets and villages of Severac, Ruffies, Cerons, La Croix du Broual, Combes, Tramons, Ruau, Les Escabrins, and Saugiere. The commune is mixed forest and farmland with significant sized urban areas.

The Riou Morte flows through the north-eastern corner of the commune as it flows north-west before turning west at Decazeville. The Enne river flows through the commune and the town from the east and continues north-west to join the Riou Morte at Viviez. The Ruisseau du Banel flows from the east north of the village and joins the Enne on the north-western border of the commune.

History

Classical Antiquity
Lucien Mazars, an author of numerous books on local history, wrote in Aubin; its history, from its origins to the Revolution of 1789: "tradition [says] that Aubin, which bore the name Albin until the end of the 18th century, was founded by the Roman General Declus Clodius Albinus or in his honour". However, General Albinus did not exercise the functions of a legate in Gaul but rather in Roman Britain. His control of Gaul was probably too short to be able to found a town.

Middle Ages
Fort Aubin initially served as a fortress and then was occupied during the Middle Ages by the Lords of Rouergue. The town became the center of important coal mines, and also had iron mines.

Contemporary era

The commune was the capital of the District of Aubin from 1790 to 1800.

In October 1869 soldiers fired on a demonstration of miners killing 14 and injuring 20. This was the second strike in the Second Empire after the one in June 1869 at La Ricamarie. Captain Bernard Gosseran who gave the order to fire on strikers was later made a chevalier of the Legion of Honour. This tragedy inspired the Ode à la Misère (Ode to Misery) and the Aubin poems to Victor Hugo.

Aubin railway station on the Capdenac-Gare to Rodez line opened in 1858.

Heraldry

Administration
List of Successive Mayors

Mayors from 1939

Demography
In 2017 the commune had 3,761 inhabitants.

Culture and heritage

Civil heritage
The commune has two buildings and structures that are registered as historical monuments:
2 Factory Chimneys (1847)
The Jules Ferry du Gua School (1876). Designed by Emmanuel Brune and built between 1876 and 1880. It is 59 metres long and 12 metres wide built on a terrace overlooking the small houses which make up the suburb of Gua.
The Town Hall contains several items that are registered as historical objects:
A Statue: Maid of Honour at the Court of Francis I (1870)
A Painting with frame: Miners of the Saar (1950)
A Painting with frame: Unnamed abstract (1973)
A Painting with frame: Confidences (1950)

Other sites of interest
The Departmental House of Memory: Museum of resistance, deportation, and citizenship
The Museum of Mines

Religious heritage
The commune has several religious buildings and structures that are registered as historical monuments:
The Church of Notre-Dame-des-Mines (1942). The Church also contains many items that are registered as historical objects:
A set of monumental paintings: Resurrection and Appearance of Christ, Ascension of Christ, Crowning of the Virgin (20th century)
A painting: Wayside Cross (1952)
A set of monumental paintings: Virgin and Child, Calvary and episodes of life of miners, Saint Famille (1951)
A set of monumental paintings and Wayside Cross: Cycle of the Passion of Christ, Episodes of life of miners (1951, 1952)
The Church of Saint-Blaise (1486). The Church also contains many items that are registered as historical objects:
A Statue: Virgin and Child (16th century)
A Group Sculpture: The Resurrection (15th century)
A Statue: Christ on the Cross (12th century)
A Group Sculpture: The Baptism of Christ (15th century)
A Baptismal font (13th century)
A Consecration Cross (12th century)
An Altar (12th century)
The Church of Gua (1865)

Facilities

Sports
The Étoile Sportive de Combes, a football club since 1921.

Notable people linked to the commune
François Cogné, sculptor.
Marie-Claire Bancquart, university professor, writer and poet, born in Aubin in 1932.
Serge Mesonès, French footballer, born in 1948, died in 2001 at Aubin.
Lilian Bathelot, novelist, author, born at Aubin in 1959.

See also
Communes of the Aveyron department

Bibliography
Lucien Mazars, Aubin, its history from its origins to the Revolution of 1789, L. Mazars, Aubin, 1982, 119 pages, Cov. ill., ill., 22 cm,  
Lucien Mazars, Mining Land, Aubin-Decazeville basin, Fil d'Ariane, Rodez, 1999, 285 pages, ill., cov. ill., 22 cm, BnF 36978991r 
Lucien Mazars and Francis Mazars, Mining Land in pictures, Decazeville-Aubin basin, Association des amis du Musée de la mine Lucien Mazars, Aubin, 2009, 265 pages, ill. in b&w and colour., cov. ill., 24 cm, BnF 41491412h 
Madeleine Raygade-Panassié, Memories of Combes, coal and fire country, Association des amis du Musée du Rouergue, Rodez, 1994, 99 pages, ill., cov. ill., 24 cm, BnF 366921465 
Christian-Pierre Bedel, preface by Pierre Beffre, Aubinh, Cransac, Firmin, Vivièrs / Christian-Pierre Bedel e los estatjants del canton d'Aubinh, Al canton collection, Mission départementale de la culture, Rodez, 1998, 247 pages, ill., cov. ill., 28 cm, ISSN 1151-8375, BnF 36708370b 
Michel Girval, Aubin, Le Gua, Combes in the time of old postcards, Amicale laïque et républicaine de la commune d'Aubin, Aubin, 1999, 200 pages, ill., cov. ill. in colour, 30 cm, BnF 37038703v 
Engineer Senez, Aubin - Geological Map of the coal basin of Aubin (Aveyron) made in 1840, Cartographic Manuscript Document, s.n., s.l., 1840, 1 flle: ms., 40x48 cm, BnF 407204575  See online
Marie-Line Montbroussous, History of a successful integration, the Spaniards in the Decazeville basin, Éd. du Rouergue, Rodez, 1995, 199 pages, ill., cov. ill.,  23 cm, BnF 36685891f 
Gérard Pertus and Michel Herranz, Basin of Decazeville, Aubin, Cransac, Firmi, Viviez, factories and metalworkers. Vol. 1, Association de sauvegarde du patrimoine industriel du Bassin de Decazeville, Decazeville, 2010, 238 pages, ill., cov. ill.,  31 cm, BnF 42307098h 
Gérard Pertus and Michel Herranz, Basin of Decazeville, Aubin, Cransac, Firmi, Viviez, factories and metalworkers. Vol. 2, Association de sauvegarde du patrimoine industriel du Bassin de Decazeville, Decazeville, 2012, 237 pages, ill., cov. ill., 31 cm, BnF 43520392g 
Gérard Pertus and Michel Herranz, Mines and miners, Decazeville basin: Aubin, Cransac, Firmi, Viviez, Association de sauvegarde du patrimoine industriel du Bassin de Decazeville, Decazeville, 2008, 211 pages, ill., cov. ill., 31 cm, BnF 41420313w 
Gérard Pertus and Michel Herranz, Mine Pits, Decazeville basin: Aubin, Cransac, Firmi, Viviez, Association de sauvegarde du patrimoine industriel du Bassin de Decazeville, Decazeville, 2007, 117 pages, ill., cov. ill., 31 cm , BnF 411843247 
Christian-Pierre Bedel, preface Pierre Beffre, Aubinh, Cransac, Firmin, Vivièrs / Christian-Pierre Bedel e los estatjants del canton d'Aubinh, Rodez, Mission départementale de la culture, 1998, Al canton coll., 247 pages, ill., cov. ill., 28 cm, ISSN 1151-8375, BnF 36708370

External links
Aubin official website 
 Church of Notre-Dame website 
Aubin on the old IGN website 
The Miner on the sculptor's website 
Aubin on Géoportail, National Geographic Institute (IGN) website 
Albin on the 1750 Cassini Map

Notes and references

Notes

References

Communes of Aveyron